Kamilla Kozuback (born  5 May 2004 Calgary) is a Hungarian-Canadian snowboarder. She competed in the 2022 Winter Olympics, in Women's big air, Women's slopestyle, and Women's halfpipe.

She competed at the  2020 Winter Youth Olympics and the 2021–22 FIS Snowboard World Cup.

References 

2004 births
Hungarian female snowboarders
Living people
Snowboarders at the 2022 Winter Olympics
Olympic snowboarders of Hungary
Snowboarders at the 2020 Winter Youth Olympics